People's Press may refer to:

Publications
 Peoples Press (Port Arthur, Texas)
 Peoples Press (Port Neches, Texas)
 People's Press, an online newspaper from Mauritius
 Donegal People's Press, County Donegal, Ireland
 Owatonna People's Press, Owatonna, Minnesota, United States
 Shanghai People's Press, China

Publishers
 People's Press (Denmark), Denmark
 People's Press (Beijing), China
 People's Press Printing Society, United Kingdom
 Yunnan People's Press